Lars-Eric Roxin (born 15 February 1945) is a Swedish curler.

In 2022 he was inducted into the Swedish Curling Hall of Fame.

Teams

Personal life
His three brothers – Claes, Göran and Björn – are also curlers.

References

External links
 

Living people
1945 births
Swedish male curlers
Swedish curling champions
20th-century Swedish people